Cyndi Lauper: Still So Unusual is an American reality television series aired on WE tv. The series debuted on January 12, 2013 at 9pm ET/PT.

Premise
The series focuses on the daily life of Cyndi Lauper as she manages her career and unusual personal life. Along with Lauper, her husband and son, David and Declyn Thornton are also shown in the series.

Episodes

References

2010s American reality television series
2013 American television series debuts
2013 American television series endings
English-language television shows
Television series based on singers and musicians
Cyndi Lauper